The 2020 Chilean Primera División, known as Campeonato Nacional AFP PlanVital 2020 for sponsorship reasons, was the 90th season of the Chilean Primera División, Chile's top-flight football league. The season started on 24 January 2020 and ended on 17 February 2021 with the relegation play-off. Universidad Católica were the defending champions, having won the previous tournament. They successfully defended their title, winning their fifteenth league championship and third in a row with a game to spare on 10 February 2021 after tying 0–0 at home with eventual league runners-up Unión La Calera.

The competition was suspended from 18 March to 29 August 2020 due to the COVID-19 pandemic.

Format changes
For this season, and given that the previous season was declared as concluded with no relegations to the Primera B, ANFP approved an expansion of the first tier to 18 teams, with two teams promoted from the second tier joining the 16 teams that competed in the top flight in 2019. The 18 teams played each other twice (once at home and once away) for a total of 34 matches. Qualification for the Copa Libertadores and Copa Sudamericana was awarded to the top eight teams at the end of the season. Originally, the Copa Chile champions would have been the fourth qualifier for the Copa Libertadores but since the 2020 Copa Chile would not be held before the start of the Copa Libertadores qualifying stages, its allocated berth was awarded to the fourth-placed team of the Campeonato Nacional instead.

Since there were no relegated teams in the previous season, in this season three teams were relegated to the second tier: the last-placed team in the standings of the 2020 season, the last-placed team in a relegation table which was elaborated considering the performance in both the 2019 and 2020 seasons, and the losers of a play-off between the teams placed second-to-last of both tables.

Teams
Eighteen teams took part in the league in this season: the sixteen teams from the previous season, plus the 2019 Primera B champions Santiago Wanderers and Deportes La Serena, winners of the Primera B promotion play-offs.

Stadia and locations

Personnel and kits

Managerial changes

Effects of the COVID-19 pandemic
On 16 March 2020, the Asociación Nacional de Fútbol Profesional (ANFP) announced the suspension of the Campeonato Nacional as well as the rest of its tournaments due to the COVID-19 pandemic, starting from 18 March 2020.

On 8 June, ANFP's Council of Presidents decided to resume the league on 31 July with matches to be played behind closed doors and clubs having at least four weeks of training sessions, pending approval from the Chilean government. However, this original date had to be pushed back as clubs were only given approval to resume training sessions starting from 16 July, with the ANFP considering the weekend of 8 August as a new tentative date of resumption, following three weeks of training sessions.

On 19 August, in a press conference held at Estadio Nacional Julio Martínez Prádanos in Santiago, Chilean President Sebastián Piñera confirmed 29 August as the date of resumption of both the first and second tier seasons, with games to be played behind closed doors. The first matches to be played would be the ones postponed from previous rounds, while the ninth round of the Campeonato Nacional would be played on the weekend of 4–6 September.

On 26 September the match between Colo-Colo and Deportes Antofagasta, scheduled to be played on that day at 11:00, was suspended due to the discovery of a positive COVID-19 case in the former team following their return from Brazil where they played a Copa Libertadores group stage match against Athletico Paranaense. It was eventually rescheduled for 10 November at 11:00, with Colo-Colo fined for the postponement of the match as well as the delay to submit their PCR test results prior to said match.

On 11 December, the ANFP announced the suspension of the Round 23 matches between Universidad de Chile and Deportes Iquique and between Unión La Calera and O'Higgins due to positive cases for COVID-19 being reported in Deportes Iquique and Unión La Calera.

Standings

Results

Top goalscorers

Source: Soccerway

Relegation

Weighted table
For this season, a weighted table was elaborated by computing an average of the points earned per game over this season and the previous one, with the average of points earned in the 2019 season weighted by 60% and the average of points earned in the 2020 season weighted by 40%. Promoted teams only had their points in the 2020 season averaged, without weighting. The team placed last in this table at the end of the season was relegated, while the team placed second-to-last qualified for the relegation play-off.

Source: ANFP

Relegation play-off
The relegation play-off was a single match played by the teams placed second-to-last in the season table and the weighted table, on neutral ground. If the same team was placed 17th in both tables, the play-off would not be played and that team would be automatically relegated, but if one of the teams in 17th position had been already relegated by placing last in either table, the team placed 16th in the table where the relegated team placed 17th would play the play-off. The losers were the third and last team relegated to the Primera B.

Awards

Team of the Season

See also
2020 Primera B de Chile

References

External links
ANFP 

Chile
2020 in Chilean sport
2020 in Chilean football
Primera División de Chile seasons
Chile
2021 in Chilean football